Nicole Denise Johnson Collier (born September 12, 1972) is a Democratic member of the Texas House of Representatives. Since 2013, she has represented District 95 in Fort Worth, Texas. Collier succeeded Marc Veasey.

A small business owner and trial lawyer, Collier is a 1996 graduate of the University of Houston. She became a single mother in high school. She graduated from the Texas Wesleyan University School of Law in Fort Worth, now Texas A&M University School of Law. Her husband is Gary Collier.

In the general election on November 4, 2014, Collier won her second term in the Texas House by defeating Republican candidate, Albert G. McDaniel, by a margin of 21,908 votes (75.8 percent) to 7,002 votes (24.2 percent).

Collier won her fourth legislative term in the general election held on November 6, 2018. With 32,953 votes (76.5 percent), Collier defeated the Republican candidate, Stephen A. West, who polled 9,384 votes (21.8 percent), and the Libertarian Party choice, Joshua G. Burns, who drew 734 (1.7 percent).

References

External links
 Biography at Ballotpedia
Legislative page

1972 births
Living people
Democratic Party members of the Texas House of Representatives
African-American state legislators in Texas
People from Houston
People from Fort Worth, Texas
Women state legislators in Texas
University of Houston alumni
Texas lawyers
Businesspeople from Texas
21st-century American politicians
21st-century American women politicians
Texas A&M University School of Law alumni
21st-century African-American women
21st-century African-American politicians
20th-century African-American people
20th-century African-American women